Javanimetrus cyaneus, the Asian blue forest scorpion, is a species of scorpions belonging to the family Scorpionidae.

Description
These scorpions are dark black, with blue reflections. The body is strongly granulated. This species is classified as harmful, as the sting causes moderate to severe pain, but without further consequences.

Distribution and habitat
This species is native to Borneo, the Philippines, and Indonesia. It can be found in tropical rainforests and wetland forests, usually under stones or fallen trees.

References

Scorpionidae
Scorpions of Asia
Animals described in 1836